Closet Freak: The Best of Cee Lo Green, The Soul Machine is a greatest hits compilation album released by American hip hop musician Cee Lo Green, also known for working with Atlanta hip hop group Goodie Mob and production duo Gnarls Barkley. The album consists of tracks from his work with the Goodie Mob and his two solo albums. The album comes on the heels of his noted mainstream rise due to the popularity of the Gnarls Barkley St. Elsewhere album and "Crazy" single. Collaborators on the album include Timbaland, Pharrell, Ludacris, Jazze Pha, T.I., and Goodie Mob members Big Gipp, T-Mo, & Khujo. The compilation was released on October 31, 2006. AllMusic.com gave the album four stars out of five, describing it as "A great whirlwind run through Cee-Lo's career, right from the start of the adventure to more well known material, including collaborations with Timbaland and Ludacris."

Track listing

References

CeeLo Green compilation albums
2006 greatest hits albums
Albums produced by Timbaland
Albums produced by DJ Premier
Albums produced by the Neptunes
Albums produced by Jazze Pha